Montfortia subemarginata, common name the emarginate limpet, is a species of sea snail, a marine gastropod mollusk in the family Fissurellidae, the keyhole limpets and slit limpets.

Description
The size of the shell varies between 11 mm and 40 mm.

Distribution
This marine species occurs off Victoria, Australia and off Tasmania.

References

External links
 Quoy J.R.C. & Gaimard J.P. (1832-1835). Voyage de découvertes de l'"Astrolabe" exécuté par ordre du Roi, pendant les années 1826-1829, sous le commandement de M. J. Dumont d'Urville. Zoologie. 1: i-l, 1-264; 2(1): 1-321 (1832); 2(2): 321-686 (1833); 3(1): 1-366 (1834); 3(2): 367-954 (1835); Atlas (Mollusques): pls 1-93 (1833). Paris: Tastu
 To World Register of Marine Species
 

Fissurellidae
Gastropods described in 1819